Winifred Anna Cavendish-Bentinck, Duchess of Portland  (née Dallas-Yorke; 7 September 1863 – 30 July 1954) was a British humanitarian and animal welfare activist.

Background
Born at Murthly Castle, Perthshire, she was the only daughter of Thomas Yorke Dallas-Yorke, DL, JP (1826 – 25 November 1924), of Walmsgate, Lincolnshire, and Frances (née Graham).

She served as a canopy bearer to Queen Alexandra at the 1902 coronation of King Edward VII, and was Mistress of the Robes from 1913 until Alexandra's death in 1925.

The Duchess was a Justice of the Peace for Nottinghamshire when based at the family seat Welbeck Abbey.

Family
She married William John Arthur James Cavendish-Bentinck on 11 June 1889. They had three children:
Lady Victoria Alexandrina Violet Cavendish-Bentinck (27 February 1890 – 8 May 1994); she married Captain Michael Erskine-Wemyss and had issue
William Arthur Henry Cavendish-Bentinck, 7th Duke of Portland (1893–1977); he married Ivy Gordon-Lennox and had issue. She was the last surviving godchild of Queen Victoria.
Lord Francis Morven Dallas Cavendish-Bentinck (27 July 1900 – 22 August 1950)

Winifred Cavendish-Bentinck, Duchess of Portland, was interred at the traditional burial place of the Dukes of Portland in the churchyard of St Winifred's Church at Holbeck.

Affiliations

The Duchess of Portland was a passionate animal lover, who kept stables for old horses and ponies, as well as dogs needing homes.
In 1891, she became the first (and longest serving) president of the Royal Society for the Protection of Birds and was vice-president of the Royal Society for the Prevention of Cruelty to Animals. She was also president of the ladies committee of the RSPCA.

She was elected as the third President of the Nottinghamshire Beekeepers' Association in 1907. The Duchess was a vegetarian and a member of the Vegetarian Society.

Social reform
In 1889, she persuaded the duke to use a large portion of his horseracing winnings to build almshouses at Welbeck, which he named "The Winnings". She cared greatly for the local miners and supported them by paying for medical treatments, and organising cooking and sewing classes for their daughters. She also sponsored a miner, with an interest in art, to study in London.

"In addition to the famous racing stables, where a number of the Duke of Portland's most celebrated horses (including "St. Simon") were to be seen, there is a group of substantially built almshouses, known as "The Winnings," which were erected by the Duke at the request of his wife out of the money won in seven races, viz., the Two Thousand Guineas in 1888 by "Ayrshire", the Derby and St. Leger in 1889 by "Donovan", the Oaks and St. Leger in 1890 by "Memoir", and the One Thousand Guineas in 1890 by "Semolina".

Honours
In honour of her support, the Nottinghamshire Miners' Welfare Association petitioned the king on her behalf; and in 1935 she was made a Dame Commander of the Order of the British Empire (DBE) on his silver jubilee.

She was also made a Dame of the Order of Queen Maria Luisa in Spain.

Legacy
In 2010, a collection of jewels belonging to the Duchess was auctioned at Christies, including antique pearl and diamond brooches, and the Portland sapphire tiara.

The Portland diamond tiara, which was specially made for Edward VII's coronation, was stolen in November 2018.

References

External links
 Biography of the Duchess, with links to online catalogues, from Manuscripts and Special Collections, The University of Nottingham

1863 births
1954 deaths
Winifred
British animal welfare workers
British duchesses by marriage
British humanitarians
British vegetarianism activists
Dames Commander of the Order of the British Empire
English justices of the peace
Mistresses of the Robes
People associated with the Vegetarian Society
People from Perth, Scotland
People from Perth and Kinross
Royal Society for the Protection of Birds people